DocNet is a consortium of university business schools granting doctoral degrees in business administration and economics. The organization states its mission as:
"...To promote doctoral education in business throughout the world. The organization educates potential students about careers in academia and engages in a variety of recruiting strategies aimed at increasing the pool of qualified applicants for doctoral-granting institutions. DocNet members share information about best practices, curriculum and admissions issues, student support, and placement. DocNet also lobbies for doctoral programs within its members' respective colleges and universities and at the national level through AACSB International, the Graduate Management Admission Council, and the media."

Member institutions
Bentley University
Binghamton University - School of Management
Boston College - Carroll School of Management
Carleton University - Sprott School of Business
Case Western Reserve University - Weatherhead School of Management
Columbia University - Columbia Business School
Duke University - Fuqua School of Business
École supérieure des sciences économiques et commerciales (ESSEC)
Emory University - Goizueta Business School
Florida State University - College of Business
Georgia Institute of Technology - College of Management
Georgia State University - J. Mack Robinson College of Business
Harvard University - Harvard Business School
HEC Paris
INSEAD
Massachusetts Institute of Technology - MIT Sloan School of Management
McGill University - Desautels Faculty of Management
New York University - Stern School of Business
Northwestern University - Kellogg School of Management
Rutgers University - Rutgers Business School
Stanford University - Stanford Graduate School of Business
Temple University - Fox School of Business and Management
Texas A&M University - Mays Business School
Texas Tech University - Rawls College of Business
University of Arizona - Eller College of Management
University of California, Berkeley - Haas School of Business
University of Central Florida - College of Business Administration
University of Chicago - Booth School of Business
University of Connecticut - School of Business
University of Florida - Warrington College of Business Administration
University of Houston - Bauer College of Business
University of Illinois at Chicago - Liautaud Graduate School of Business
University of Illinois at Urbana–Champaign - College of Business
University of Iowa	- Tippie College of Business
University of Kansas - School of Business
University of London - London Business School
University of Maryland - Robert H. Smith School of Business
University of Michigan - Ross School of Business
University of Minnesota - Carlson School of Management
University of Oregon - Charles H. Lundquist College of Business
University of Pennsylvania - Wharton School 
University of Pittsburgh - Joseph M. Katz Graduate School of Business
University of South Carolina - Moore School of Business
University of Southern California - Marshall School of Business
University of Texas at Austin - McCombs School of Business
University of Texas at Dallas - Naveen Jindal School of Management
University of Toronto - Rotman School of Management
University of Washington - Michael G. Foster School of Business
University of Wisconsin–Madison - Wisconsin School of Business
Vanderbilt University - Owen Graduate School of Management
Washington State University - College of Business
Wayne State University - School of Business Administration

External links
Official website

International college and university associations and consortia
Business schools